Andrew Keogh (November 14, 1869 – February 13, 1953) was an English-born American librarian. 

Keogh started his library career as a librarian with the Newcastle-upon-Tyne Public Library in England from 1892-1898. He then became librarian of the Linonia and Brothers Library at Yale University in 1899 and became a reference librarian at the Yale University Library from 1900 to 1916. He was promoted to head librarian at Yale in 1916 and served in that position until his retirement in 1938.  Keogh served as president of the American Library Association from 1929 to 1930.

Upon his retirement, Keogh was named a Librarian Emeritus at Yale until his death in 1953. Keogh was also a lecturer and professor of bibliography from 1902 to 1938.

See also
Yale University Library
Library science

References

External links
 Picture of Keogh on a trip to Los Angeles in 1930 from the American Library Association Archives Digital Collections

 

1869 births
1953 deaths
American librarians
English librarians
Yale University people
Yale Sterling Professors